The 1998 Safari Rally (formally the 46th Safari Rally Kenya) was held between 28 February and 2 March 1998. It was the first World Rally Championship victory for Richard Burns and his co-driver Robert Reid after his teammate Tommi Mäkinen and fellow Briton Colin McRae both retired.

Report

WRC
A total of 49 cars gathered in Nairobi for the Safari Rally of 1998. The young Briton, 27-year-old Richard Burns, won stage 1. But his more experienced teammate, Tommi Mäkinen, snatched the lead in stage 2. He was determined to win for the second time, as 1996's winner. But his hopes were dashed after his timing belt broke, causing him to retire. Burns retained the lead as a result, held it to the end, and won his first WRC rally in his career. It was the Ford Escorts of the Finns Juha Kankkunen and Ari Vatanen, both previous Safari Rally winners, who completed the podium in second and third respectively.

PWRC
Luis Climent, in a Mitsubishi Lancer Evo III, had his first victory of the year. Manfred Stohl finished behind him in second, and the Kenyan Paul Bailey completed the podium.

Results 

Source: Independent WRC archive

References

External links 
 Official website of the World Rally Championship
 1998 Safari Rally at Rallye-info 

Safari Rally
Safari
1998 in Kenyan sport